The 2008–2009 figure skating season began on July 1, 2008, and ended on June 30, 2009. Figure skaters use music in competition.

Skaters in the four disciplines of men's singles, ladies' singles, pair skating and ice dancing used the following music in their 2008–2009 competitive programs.

Men

Ladies

Pairs

Ice dancing

References 

Music
Music
Figure skating-related lists